Jason Arnopp is a British novelist and scriptwriter, with a background in journalism.

He wrote the 2011 horror feature Stormhouse and has scripted Doctor Who audiobooks and plays for the BBC and Big Finish ranges. In 2012, two of his horror stories, "Beast in the Basement" and "A Sincere Warning About the Entity in Your Home" were published for Kindle. He has contributed to BBC Radio 4's Recorded for Training Purposes and Laurence & Gus comedy shows. His background is in journalism  and he has regularly written for the likes of Heat and Doctor Who Magazine. In December 2013, he was a talking-head on Channel Five's The Greatest Ever Christmas Movies (Objective Productions).

In 2016, his novel The Last Days of Jack Sparks was published by Orbit Books. It has since been optioned as a movie by Imagine Entertainment.

Arnopp is represented by Oli Munson at AM Heath Literary Agents and managed by Lawrence Mattis at Circle of Confusion

He used to be an editor for Kerrang! magazine; he appears as himself in Lords of Chaos, contacting Euronymous to inquire about the Black Circle.

His latest novel is Ghoster, published in 2019.

Writing credits

References

External links
 
 
 
 Screenwriter's Festival: Guest Speakers
 

Living people
21st-century British novelists
British male screenwriters
British male novelists
21st-century British male writers
Year of birth missing (living people)
21st-century British screenwriters